Casearia coriifolia is a species of flowering plant in the family Salicaceae. It is endemic to New Caledonia.

References

Endemic flora of New Caledonia
coriifolia
Conservation dependent plants
Taxonomy articles created by Polbot